The 1993–94 Louisville Cardinals men's basketball team represented the University of Louisville in the 1993–94 NCAA Division I men's basketball season. The head coach was Denny Crum and the team finished the season with an overall record of 28–6.

Roster

Schedule and results

|-
!colspan=9 style=| Regular season

|-
!colspan=9 style=| Metro Conference tournament

|-
!colspan=9 style=| NCAA Tournament

Rankings

*AP did not release post-NCAA Tournament rankings

NBA draft

References 

Louisville Cardinals men's basketball seasons
Louisville
Louisville
Louisville Cardinals men's basketball, 1993-94
Louisville Cardinals men's basketball, 1993-94